Léon Moutrier was a Luxembourgish politician and diplomat.  A member of Luxembourg's Chamber of Deputies for the Liberal League, he served as the Director-General for the Interior and Public Information from 24 February 1916 until 3 January 1917, and for Justice and Public Information from that date until 28 September 1918.

Ministers for Justice of Luxembourg
Members of the Chamber of Deputies (Luxembourg)
Members of the Council of State of Luxembourg
Luxembourgian people of World War I
1872 births
1940 deaths